Cái Nước is a rural district of Cà Mau province in the Mekong Delta region of Vietnam. As of 2004 the district had a population of 139,552. The district capital lies at Cái Nước.

The district was split in 2004 to form a new district of Cà Mau Province. It previously covered an area of 670 km² but today covers 395.14 km².

Cái Nước is bordered by Đầm Dơi district to the east, Năm Căn district to the south, Cà Mau City to the north, Trần Văn Thời district to the northwest and Phú Tân district to the west.
 
Cái Nước has gardens famous for their birdlife. Like other areas on the Cà Mau peninsula, the terrain is that of a floodplain, and as such, the main industry is marine-based. The dominant industry in the area is prawn and blue crab farming.

On May 17, 1984, when it was still part of Minh Hải province, Cái Nước comprised the capital Phú Tân and 32 communes: Cái Nước, Hiệp Hưng, Trần Thời, Tân Thới, Tân Hưng, Phong Hưng, Tân Hưng Đông, Hưng Mỹ, Bình Mỹ, Phú Lộc, Phú Hưng, Tân Hiệp, Đông Thới, Thanh Hưng, Thạch Phúc, Thạnh Trung, Lương Thế Tân, Hoà Mỹ, Tân Hải, Phú Hoà, Phú Hiệp, Việt Thắng, Việt Hùng, Tân Hưng Tây, Nguyễn Việt Khái, Phú Thuận, Phú Mỹ A, Phú Thành, Tân Nghiệp, Tân Phong, Việt Dũng and Việt Cường.

Divisions
The district includes 10 commune-level subdivisions, including the township of Cái Nước and the rural communes of Trần Thới, Tân Hưng, Tân Hưng Đông, Hưng Mỹ, Phú Hưng, Lương Thế Trân, Hoà Mỹ, Đông Thới, Thạnh Phú and Đông Hưng.

References

Districts of Cà Mau province